Richard David Boyle (March 26, 1942 – September 1, 2016) was a journalist, photographer, and author from the United States. He wrote the 1972 book Flower of the Dragon: The Breakdown of the U. S. Army in Vietnam: An Eyewitness Account of the Day-to-Day Environment of American Soldiers in Vietnam. He co-wrote the 1986 movie Salvador with Oliver Stone. He covered the revolution in Cambodia, The Troubles in Ireland and the civil war in Lebanon. In the Republic of Vietnam, he documented the resistance of U.S. troops against the war. Salvador was nominated for two Academy Awards: Best Actor in a Leading Role (Woods) and Best Writing, Screenplay Written Directly for the Screen (Stone and Boyle). Boyle was played in Salvador by James Woods and the cast included Jim Belushi, Michael Murphy and John Savage. He taught journalism in Southern California colleges. He also ran as a gadfly for public office, including for Supervisor and City Treasurer in San Francisco, in 1977 and 1977, and for the 42nd District of the California State Assembly in 1988.  He died in the Philippines while covering the beginning of the reign of President Rodrigo Duterte.

Publications
 Flower of the Dragon: The Breakdown of the U. S. Army in Vietnam—An Eyewitness Account of the Day-to-Day Environment of American Soldiers in Vietnam. San Francisco, Calif.: Ramparts Press (1972). .
 GI Revolts: The Breakdown of the U.S. Army in Vietnam. San Francisco, Calif.: United Front Press (May 1973).
 "The Strange Death of Clay Shaw." True (Apr. 1975), pp. 54-57, 78-79.

References

External links

American war correspondents
1942 births
2016 deaths
Journalists from California
People from San Francisco
20th-century American journalists
American male journalists
21st-century American journalists
20th-century American non-fiction writers
American male non-fiction writers
20th-century American male writers